Sackie Teah Doe (born December 8, 1988) is a professional footballer who plays as a midfielder for Liga 2 club Gresik United. He formerly represented the Liberia national team, and obtained Indonesia citizenship through naturalization.

Club career

Barito Putera
In 2019, Sackie Doe signed a contract with Indonesian Liga 1 club Barito Putera. He made his league debut on 23 September 2019 in a match against Persija Jakarta at the Patriot Candrabaga Stadium, Bekasi

Persik Kediri
He was signed for Persik Kediri to play in Liga 1 in the 2020 season. Sackie Doe made his league debut on 29 February 2020 in a match against Persebaya Surabaya at the Gelora Bung Tomo Stadium, Surabaya. This season was suspended on 27 March 2020 due to the COVID-19 pandemic. The season was abandoned and was declared void on 20 January 2021.

Gresik United
Sackie Doe was signed for Gresik United to play in Liga 2 in the 2022 season.

Career statistics

International

Honours

Club honors
Barito Putera
Premier Division: 2011–12

Individual honors
 Premier Division Top Goalscorer: 2011–12 (18 goals)

References

External links
 Sackie Doe at Soccerway
 

1988 births
Living people
Sportspeople from Monrovia
Liberian footballers
Liberia international footballers
Association football defenders
Liga 1 (Indonesia) players
Invincible Eleven players
LPRC Oilers players
Deltras F.C. players
Bhayangkara F.C. players
PS Barito Putera players
Zwegabin United F.C. players

Liberian expatriate footballers
Expatriate footballers in Indonesia
Liberian expatriate sportspeople in Indonesia
Expatriate footballers in Myanmar
Liberian expatriate sportspeople in Myanmar
Naturalised citizens of Indonesia